Beltrán de la Cueva y Toledo, 3rd Duke of Alburquerque, (in full), (c. 1478 - 11 February 1560) was a Spanish nobleman and military leader.

He was born in Cuéllar, the son of Don Francisco Fernández de la Cueva, 2nd Duke of Alburquerque and of Francisca de Toledo, daughter of García Álvarez de Toledo, 1st Duke of Alba. Beltrán de la Cueva was appointed captain general of the Spanish Army, and commander-in-chief of the English Army in France (under queen Mary I of England). He was named a Knight of the Order of the Golden Fleece in 1531, a Viceroy of Aragon in 1535, and a Viceroy of Navarre in 1552, position he held until his death in 1560.

Sources

1478 births
1560 deaths
Viceroys of Aragon
Viceroys of Navarre
Lords of Cuéllar
103
Counts of Ledesma
Counts of Huelma
Knights of the Golden Fleece
Spanish generals